Ironiclast is the debut album by American heavy metal supergroup The Damned Things. The album was released on December 14, 2010 internationally and a day later in North America. The supergroup includes Joe Trohman and Andy Hurley of Fall Out Boy, Scott Ian and Rob Caggiano of Anthrax and Keith Buckley and Josh Newton of Every Time I Die. Newton, however, was only a touring member of The Damned Things initially, and did not write or record anything for Ironiclast. The album was self-produced by Caggiano and Trohman, and was released through Mercury Records.

Promotion
On October 21, 2010, the band released the song "Friday Night (Going Down in Flames)" for free via their Facebook and Myspace pages.

On October 25, 2010, the band released the first single from the album, "We've Got a Situation Here", on iTunes. Previously a demo of the song, along with the demo of the title track "Ironiclast", were released on the band's Myspace page on May 30, 2010.

On December 1, 2010, a music video for the song "We've Got a Situation Here" premiered and was directed by Brendon Small.

On December 6, 2010, the song "Handbook for the Recently Deceased" premiered for free streaming on GuitarWorld.com. On December 7, 2010, the song "Black Heart" premiered for free streaming on Spin.com.

Musical style
With this album, the band was aiming for a heavy/classic rock, blues-oriented, riff-oriented sound, while trying to avoid the cliches associated with those styles and combining elements from their own bands. The result is a classic hard rock sound combined with the heavier aspects of Anthrax and Every Time I Die and the hook-laden choruses of Fall Out Boy. Guitarist Joe Trohman cited Led Zeppelin and Thin Lizzy as influences on the record.

Reception

Drew Beringer of AbsolutePunk gave a positive review of the album, saying that "it’s heavy, hook-laden, and stuffed with huge riffs. It’s basically a modern take on the classic rock record" and that "this is just a straight up rock and roll takeover" with an overall rating of 92%.

Charts
Ironiclast sold 6,200 copies in its first week, placing it at No. 1 on the Billboard Heatseekers chart for "new and developing artists". It sold 31,000 copies as of February 2013.

Track listing

Personnel

The Damned Things
 Keith Buckley – lead vocals
 Rob Caggiano – lead guitar, bass, backing vocals, percussion
 Scott Ian – rhythm guitar, backing vocals
 Joe Trohman – lead guitar, backing vocals, percussion
 Andy Hurley – drums

Additional musicians
 Stephanie Alexander – backing vocals
 Tabitha Fair – backing vocals
 Nick Raskulinecz – percussion

Artwork and design
 The Damned Things – art direction, concept
 Patrick Hegarty – art coordinator
 Doug Joswick – package production
 Mike Mitchell – art direction, concept
 Kristen Yiengst – art coordinator

Recording and production
 Rob Caggiano – engineer, producer
 Ben Terry – mixing assistant
 Tara Bryan – A&R
 Evan Lipschutz – A&R
 Jon Martinez – assistant engineer
 Dave McNair – mastering
 Claudius Mittendorfer – drum engineering
 Nick Raskulinecz – mixing
 Dante Renzi – drum technician
 Bryan Russell – editing, engineer
 Joe Trohman – producer
 Teruhisa Uchiyama – assistant engineer

References

2010 debut albums
The Damned Things albums
Mercury Records albums